Born to Love is Taiwanese Mandopop rock band Mayday's sixth Mandarin studio album. It was released on 29 December 2006 by Rock Records and B'in Music. The album singles have spawned several music videos such as Born To Love, Angel and Another First Love. 

The track "天使" (Unauthorised Cover? of Mr Children/) won one of the Top 10 Songs of the Year at the 2008 HITO Radio Music Awards presented by Taiwanese radio station Hit FM. In 2021, the hit "天使" was adapted to bachata in Spanish by Dominican singer Luys Bien.

Track listing

References

External links
 Born to Love

2006 albums
Mayday (Taiwanese band) albums